Guinea–Israel relations refers to the current and historical relationship between Guinea and Israel.

History
Israel had diplomatic relations in 1958. In 1967, Guinea cut ties with Israel. Diplomatic relations were re-established in July 2016.

Trade relations

Israel exported a total of US$4.13 million to Guinea in 2014, mainly electronics and raw materials, while Guinea's exports to Israel totaled US$6.95 million, almost exclusively raw diamonds. In 2015 Israel did not import diamonds from Guinea, bringing imports down to about US$23,000. Israel's exports to Guinea totaled US$3.66 million that year.

See also 
Foreign relations of Guinea
Foreign relations of Israel
Economy of Israel

References

 
Israel
Bilateral relations of Israel